Aldeadávila de la Ribera is a village and municipality in the north-west of the province of Salamanca, western Spain, part of the autonomous community of Castile and León.

References

External links

Municipalities in the Province of Salamanca